Clavicula Salomonis may refer to:
Clavicula Salomonis, the 15th century grimoire the Key of Solomon
Lemegeton Clavicula Salomonis, the 17th century grimoire The Lesser Key of Solomon
Clavicula Salomonis (EP), a 2005 EP by De Magia Veterum

See also
Key of Solomon (disambiguation)